Button Island may refer to:

Button Islands, in the Canadian Arctic Archipelago
Button Islands (Andaman and Nicobar Islands)
Button Island (Massachusetts)
Button Island (Western Australia)
Button Island, one of the Engineer Islands in Southeast Papua New Guinea